Henry Moore Sandford, 1st Baron Mount Sandford (28 July 1751 – 29 December 1814), was an Irish landowner and politician.

Early life
Sandford was the son of Henry Sandford by the Honourable Sarah Moore, daughter of Stephen Moore, 1st Viscount Mountcashell.

Career
He was returned to the Irish House of Commons for Roscommon Borough in 1776, a seat he held until 1783 and again between 1791 and 1800. The latter year he was elevated to the Peerage of Ireland as Baron Mount Sandford, of Castlerea in the County of Roscommon, with remainder in default of male issue of his own, to his brothers William and George, and the heirs male of their bodies.

Personal life
Lord Mount Sandford married Katherine Oliver, daughter of Silver Oliver, in 1780. They had no surviving children.

Lord Mount Sandford died in December 1814, aged 63, and was succeeded in the barony according to the special remainder by his nephew Henry Sandford, the son of William Sandford. Lady Mount Sandford died in October 1818.

References

1751 births
1814 deaths
Barons in the Peerage of Ireland
Peers of Ireland created by George III
Irish MPs 1776–1783
Irish MPs 1790–1797
Irish MPs 1798–1800
Members of the Parliament of Ireland (pre-1801) for County Roscommon constituencies